Harpactor is a genus of assassin bug family (Reduviidae), in the subfamily Harpactorinae.

Some species have been investigated for their potential as biological pest control agents in integrated pest management.

Species 
The Global Biodiversity Information Facility lists:
 Harpactor angulosus (Lepeletier & Serville, 1825)
 Harpactor bisagittatus Pennington
 † Harpactor bruckmanni Heer, 1853
 † Harpactor chomeraciensis Riou, 1999
 † Harpactor constrictus Heer, 1853
 Harpactor distinguendus (Stål, 1859)
 † Harpactor gracilis Heer, 1853
 Harpactor incertus (Distant, 1903)
 † Harpactor longipes Heer, 1853
 † Harpactor maculipes Heer, 1853
 † Harpactor obsoletus Heer, 1853
 Harpactor ornatus Uhler
 Harpactor rhombeus (Erichson, 1848)
 Harpactor shevroyensis Hegde, 1989
 Harpactor tuberculosus Stål, 1872

References

External links

 Bioone.org: information on H. angulosus
 Flickr: photo by ACBC Lopes - Harpactor sp aff rhombeus, Peruvian Amazon

Reduviidae
Cimicomorpha genera